Father Guy Pagès (born 18 August 1958) is a French Roman Catholic abbot and author. He is known for his writings about Islam.

Early life
Guy Pagès was born on 18 August 1958.

Career
Pagès was ordained by the Roman Catholic Archdiocese of Paris in 1994. He is the author of several books on Christianity and Islam.

Bibliography
Éléments pour le dialogue islamo-chrétien (co-authored with Ahmed Almahoud, Paris: Éditions François-Xavier de Guibert, 2006).
Judas est en enfer (Paris: Éditions François-Xavier de Guibert, 2007).
Interroger l'Islam : Éléments pour le dialogue islamo-chrétien (prefaced by Germano Bernardini; Paris: Éditions Dominique Martin Morin, 2013).
Interroger l'Islam : 1235 questions à poser aux Musulmans ! (prefaced by Joseph Fadelle).

References

1958 births
Living people
French Roman Catholic priests
French Roman Catholic writers